Cadet Soccer Stadium is a soccer-specific stadium in Colorado Springs, Colorado on the grounds of the United States Air Force Academy. It is home to the Air Force Falcons men's and women's soccer teams.

History
The stadium was built in 1995 with a capacity of 1,000. In 1998, it was upgraded and expanded to a capacity of 2,000 in order to host NCAA tournament games. In 2003, permanent lights were added to the stadium.

Important Matches

References

Soccer
College soccer venues in the United States
Soccer venues in Colorado
Sports venues completed in 1995
1995 establishments in Colorado